Shallow Ground is a 2004 horror film written and directed by Sheldon Wilson and starring Timothy V. Murphy, Stan Kirsch, Lindsey Stoddart, Patty McCormack, and Rocky Marquette.  A naked teenage boy (Rocky Marquette) appears at a soon-to-be abandoned sheriff's station, drenched in blood, on the one-year anniversary of the disappearance of a local girl that remains unsolved. Sheriff Jack Shepherd (Timothy V. Murphy) searches for the boy's true identity and intentions, while dealing with his guilt over failing to save the girl and solve her disappearance.

Plot summary

The residents of the small town of Shallow Valley are preparing to leave as the looming mystery of several disappearances the past year has left nothing but a sense of dread.

While packing up the sheriff's station, Deputies Laura Russell and Stuart Dempsey are horrified by the sight of a naked teenage boy, covered head-to-toe in blood. The boy wanders through the station to the holding cells, tasting the blood of the local drunk named Harvey. As the boy is restrained, Laura notices that at some point, he covered the faces of several specific people in photographs with his bloodied fingertips.

Under pressure and riddled with guilt over the unsolved disappearances, Sheriff Jack Shepherd assumes the bloody boy to be behind it all and sets out into the woods to investigate where he came from. Tracking the boy's bloody footprints, Jack is horrified as the path leads to the same location that he last saw family friend Amy Underhill.

A year earlier, Amy was abducted and Jack found her chained to a tree in the woods. Believing that the culprit was still nearby, Jack freed Amy and left her for just a moment... only to find her gone when he returned. Making contact with dripping blood, Jack relives this moment and experiences the deaths of each person that went missing at the hands of a hooded individual, with him and the bloody boy both convulsing and puking as a result.

Elsewhere, Vet Darby Owens says goodbye to family friend Helen Reedy. Over a year earlier, Helen’s husband and daughter were killed in an accident during construction of the town dam. Since Helen’s daughter was close to Darby, she asks the girl to stay for at least the rest of the day to soothe her loneliness until family arrive for dinner. Darby declines, as she intends to leave town as well before the day’s end. Samples of the blood the boy was drenched in is passed on to Darby to analyze. Not knowing about the situation at the station, Darby is confused as the test results show the blood belongs to several people.

Believing the boy could possibly be a killer, Stuart checks his fingerprints. The boy’s blood strangely travels towards Stuart, and upon contact, reveals to him that Harvey is a serial killer. Experiencing the memories of a young Harvey killing teenage hitchhikers and having sex with their bodies, Stuart immediately guns him down. Jack and the others are further disturbed as not only does the boy’s fingerprints match each of the missing victims, his face seems to be a composite of theirs as well. The boy’s voice changes to that of Amy, and asks Jack if he understands what it feels like be strung up and cut open. Forcing Jack to relive Amy’s memories once again, the boy escapes the station unseen.

As Jack and the others split up to investigate further, the hooded individual strikes again, abducting Darby. Laura soon gets a call from her father Detective Russell, warning her to stay away from the boy, and asks if Stuart is nearby. Before Russell can explain, the signal is cut off.

At night, Russell arrives in Shallow Valley and confronts Stuart about a drug dealer that died a year earlier. The drug dealer had been killed by Stuart and his former partner to keep him quiet about their dealings, and said partner had recently been killed by a naked man covered in blood. Russell explains that all over the world, the dead are rising up and seeking revenge on those that killed them. The dead manifest as blood-covered humans, and if a killer has more than one victim, they all merge into a single composite being. The blood-covered boy is one such being, made up of Amy and those who went missing in Shallow Valley.

Russell continues into town in search of Laura, while Stuart is killed by the once dead drug dealer. 
Tracking the boy again, Jack arrives at Helen’s house to find that she’s unharmed and unaware of what’s going on. Helen accepts Jack’s request to borrow her car and walks off into a back room to find her keys, while complaining about the increasing number of flies in her house. Turning his back for just a moment, Jack is shot by a blank and falls out onto the front steps of Helen’s house. Regaining his footing, Jack walks back into the house only to be ambushed by a hiding Helen.

Returning to the station, Laura is confronted by Amy’s father Albert, and is forced at gunpoint to look for Jack. After spending the night drinking and watching videos from Amy’s last birthday party, Albert intends to force Jack to find his daughter, or he’ll kill Laura. Jack awakes, only to find himself tied up in a dining room full of people. In horror, Jack realizes that the dining room is populated not by people, but the disfigured bodies of the missing victims, including Amy and Darby.

When Helen’s husband and daughter were killed in the Shallow Valley dam accident, she was driven mad and plotted a twisted revenge on those who built the dam. Helen stalked the spouses and children of those involved and one by one, whenever they were alone, would sedate them with an injection and drag them out into the woods. Helen would strip her victims naked and chain them to a tree, slicing parts of their bodies open once they had regained consciousness. Once they were drained of their blood, Helen would stitch her victims closed, dress their bodies, and take them back to her home to further disfigure them in her dining room.

Distracted by Laura and Albert's sudden arrival, Helen rushes outside and opens fire. Enraged at seeing Amy’s father die, the bloody boy wails and advances towards Helen. As the gun goes off, Helen and the boy's blood connects, revealing to him that she’s the killer. Panicked, Helen fails to take Laura hostage and flees into the woods. Freeing himself from his bindings, Jack rushes outside and gives chase.

Once alone, Helen turns to shoot Jack, only to find the bloody boy standing between them. Jack watches on as the boy slits Helen’s neck vertical, reaches inside and begins strangling her. Jack leaves Helen to suffer her fate, ignoring her feeble attempts at screaming for his help. Just as he did before with Jack, the boy forces Helen to relives the deaths of her victims, mentally and also physically, again and again until she finally dies.

The next morning, Jack, Laura, and Russell bury Amy and the other victims. The three depart from Shallow Valley, unsure of everything that’s happened and what's next. The bloody boy watches on, and walks off into the woods, finally at peace… only to suddenly be attacked and killed by another bloody creature, this one much larger and more demonic-looking.

Cast
 Timothy V. Murphy	 as	    Jack Sheppard
 Stan Kirsch		     as	    Stuart Dempsey
 Lindsey Stoddart	 as	    Laura Russell
 Patty McCormack	     as	    Helen Reedy
 Rocky Marquette	     as	    The Bloody Boy
 Natalie Avital		 as	    Darby Owens
 Chris Hendrie		 as	    Albert Underhill
 Tara Killian		 as	    Amy Underhill
 Myron Natwick	     as	    Harvey
 Steve Eastin		 as	    Detective Russell
 John Kapelos		 as	    Leroy Riley
 Christine Avila	     as	    Mrs. Underhill
 Ori Pfeffer		     as	    Curtis

Production
In reference to the scene where Darby gets attacked in the medical van, Natalie Avital said, "The stunt coordinator was great. For the scene where I am hanging from the branch they had this box and between takes they would throw the box in for me to rest on. It was a little wild when I was hanging, but I was hanging."

Reception 
In the United States' review aggregator, the Rotten Tomatoes, in the score where the site staff categorizes the opinions of independent media and mainstream media only positive or negative, the film has an approval rating of 57% calculated based on 7 critics reviews. By comparison, with the same opinions being calculated using a weighted arithmetic mean, the score achieved is 5,8/10.

References

External links
 
 
 
 Shallow Ground at Bloody-Disgusting.com

2004 films
2004 horror films
2000s supernatural horror films
American supernatural horror films
Resurrection in film
2000s English-language films
Films directed by Sheldon Wilson
2000s American films